Dante Acosta (January 1, 1963) is an American politician who currently serves on the Santa Clarita Valley Water Agency board of directors. He previously served in the California State Assembly. A Republican, he represented the 38th Assembly District, encompassing Simi Valley, far northern San Fernando Valley, and most of the Santa Clarita Valley. Prior to being elected to the State Assembly, he was a member of the Santa Clarita City Council.

Acosta was first elected to the State Assembly in November 2016. In 2018, he was defeated for re-election in a rematch with his 2016 opponent, Democrat Christy Smith. Shortly after losing the election, he was nominated to serve on board of the Santa Clarita Valley Water Agency as the Val Verde representative. Two days after his nomination, Acosta opened a campaign committee for the 2020 election.

2018 California State Assembly

2016 California State Assembly

References

External links 
 Campaign website
 Join California - Dante Acosta

Republican Party members of the California State Assembly
California city council members
People from Santa Clarita, California
Living people
21st-century American politicians
Mexican-American people in California politics
1963 births